Portrait of Alessandro Manzoni is an 1841 oil on canvas portrait of Alessandro Manzoni by Francesco Hayez, now in the Pinacoteca di Brera. It was commissioned in 1840 by Manzoni's second wife countess Teresa Borri Stampa and his son Stefano. After fifteen sittings the painter completed the work on 26 June 1841. Eight years later Teresa commissioned a portrait of herself by the same artist.

References

1841 paintings
Manzoni
Manzoni
Paintings in the collection of the Pinacoteca di Brera